The 2009 Wisconsin–Whitewater Warhawks football team was an American football team that represented the University of Wisconsin–Whitewater as a member of the Wisconsin Intercollegiate Athletic Conference (WIAC) during the 2009 NCAA Division III football season. In their third season under head coach Lance Leipold, the Warhawks compiled a perfect 15–0 record and won the NCAA Division III national championship.

Schedule

References

Wisconsin–Whitewater Warhawks
Wisconsin–Whitewater Warhawks football seasons
NCAA Division III Football Champions
College football undefeated seasons
Wisconsin–Whitewater Warhawks football